Chauga may refer to:
Chauga, Iran, village in Kermanshah Province, Iran
Chauga River, in South Carolina, USA
Chauga Mound, historic site in South Carolina, USA